Willis Jefferson Flournoy (August 9, 1895 – November 22, 1964) was an American baseball pitcher in the Negro leagues. He played from 1919 to 1932. He was nicknamed Jesse, Lefty, and Pud. He won the Eastern Colored League earned run average (ERA) title in 1926 for the Brooklyn Royal Giants.

On August 19, 1925, Flournoy struck William Williams, 18, while driving at a Brooklyn intersection. He then drove Williams, who was found to have a fractured skull and possible internal injuries, to the hospital for treatment. Flournoy reported the incident to police, who did not press charges.

References

External links
 and Baseball-Reference Black Baseball stats and Seamheads

1895 births
Year of death unknown
Almendares (baseball) players
American expatriate baseball players in Cuba
Bacharach Giants players
Baltimore Black Sox players
Hilldale Club players
Brooklyn Royal Giants players
Baseball players from Georgia (U.S. state)
Baseball pitchers

Atlanta Black Crackers players